Horatio "White Cloud" Jones (October 23, 1888 – September 8, 1985) was a professional football player who played in the National Football League during the 1922 season.

Biography
Jones was born on the Cattaraugus Indian Reservation and attended Haskell Indian Nations University. In 1922, he joined the NFL's Oorang Indians for two games. The Indians were an early NFL franchise based in LaRue, Ohio, composed only of Native Americans, and coached by Jim Thorpe.

References

Further reading

External links
Uniform Numbers of the NFL

	

1888 births
1985 deaths
Players of American football from New York (state)
Native American players of American football
Oorang Indians players
Haskell Indian Nations University alumni